Platinx is an extinct genus of prehistoric ray-finned fish.

References

Crossognathiformes